Geraldine's Fortune is a 2004 Canadian comedy-drama film. It was directed by John N. Smith, written by Tim Burns and based on the play Les Belles-sœurs by Michel Tremblay.

Plot
Geraldine Liddle (Curtin) is a small town woman from New Brunswick who gains local fame as she is about to appear on a gameshow called Bring Home the Bacon (a show with a pig theme similar to Who Wants to Be a Millionaire?) with a top prize of $2 million dollars. As friends and family gather to watch Geraldine on television, family secrets come to surface and a physical fight occurs, bringing all the family and friends outdoors. As the fight is happening, Geraldine calls them for help with a question during the gameshow. After the question is asked, the scene turns back to the home where the fight is happening outdoors and where only Geraldine's elderly mother, who has less than her full faculties, is left alone, inside near the phone. The telephone rings and rings and rings, until finally she answers. Geraldine, realizing the senility of the woman, doesn't know whether to trust her answer. Geraldine and her husband return to announce whether she answered the question correctly or not, only to discover long buried family truths have come to light.

Cast
 Jane Curtin ... as Geraldine Liddle
 Mary Walsh ... as Rose Owens
 Sheila McCarthy ... as Tina
 Matt Frewer ... as Cameron Geary
 Peter MacNeill ... as Henry Liddle
 Monique Mercure ... as Olive Larose
 Marina Orsini ... as Cilla
 Pascale Montpetit ... as Diede Murphy
 Patrick McKenna ... as Louie Owen
 Jennifer Morehouse ... as Greta Jones
 Nicole Maillet ... as Linda Liddle
 Tori Mitchell ... as Luara Larose
 Dylan Smith ... as Josh Fisher

External links
 
 

2004 films
English-language Canadian films
Canadian comedy-drama films
2004 comedy-drama films
Films directed by John N. Smith
Films set in New Brunswick
2000s English-language films
2000s Canadian films